The IMAM Ro.26, sometimes called the Romeo Ro.26, was a single-engine biplane trainer aircraft produced by the Italian aeronautical company IMAM in the early 1930s. Only one example was built.

Development

At the beginning of 1932, the Italian company SA Industrie Meccaniche e Aeronautiche Meridurali (IMAM) manufactured the Ro.26 biplane, a basic trainer aircraft based on a design by aeronautical engineer Giovanni Galasso. It was powered by a seven-cylinder,  Armstrong Siddeley Lynx radial engine, built under licence by Alfa Romeo as the Lince. IMAM intended to market the new aircraft for basic pilot training and use in aerobatic competitions. The Ro.26′s design also allowed it to serve as a trainer for seaplane pilots by converting into a floatplane as the Ro.26I — or Ro.26 Idro ("Hydro") — with the landing gear replaced by floats. The prototype, registered as I-ABIL, flew for the first time in 1932.

Design

The Ro.26 was a biplane trainer aircraft with equal-span wings with a slight upward cant. The wings and tail section were of all-wooden construction and covered with canvas. The fuselage was of all-metal construction, built with autogenously welded steel tubes.

The aircraft had fixed, wide-track rear tricycle landing gear with oil-elastic shock absorbers. A pair of floats could replace the landing gear in order to transform the aircraft into a floatplane. The open cockpits were arranged in tandem, with the instructor placed in the first cockpit, accessible from a door positioned on the right side of the fuselage. The pilot in the forward cockpit could engage and disengage the flight controls in flight at will.

Operational history
At the beginning of 1934 the Regia Aeronautica (Italian Royal Air Force) tested the Ro.26 prototype I-ABIL. Although the aircraft displayed good flight characteristics, the military authorities decided not to buy it. IMAM abandoned plans for series production and built no additional examples.

Variants
Ro.26 Biplane basic trainer, powered by a  Alfa Romeo Lynx 7-cylinder radial engine.
Ro.26I

Operators

IMAM

Specifications (Ro.26)

References

Notes

Bibliography

External links
Photo: Side view of Ro-26 I-ABIL at airwar.ru
Photo: Front view of Ro-26 I-ABIL at airwar.ru
Photo: Side view of Ro.26 I-ABIL equipped with floats in Ro-26I configuration at airwar.ru

Ro.26
1930s Italian civil trainer aircraft
1930s Italian military trainer aircraft
Biplanes
Single-engined tractor aircraft
Aircraft first flown in 1932